Lumen Christi College may refer to:
Lumen Christi College, Perth, a co-educational secondary college in Martin, Western Australia
Lumen Christi College, Derry, a co-educational grammar school in Derry, Northern Ireland

See also
Lumen Christi Catholic High School in Jackson, Michigan